The 2022–23 Robert Morris Colonials men's basketball team represented Robert Morris University in the 2022–23 NCAA Division I men's basketball season. The Colonials, led by 13th-year head coach Andrew Toole, played their home games at the UPMC Events Center in Moon Township, Pennsylvania as members of the Horizon League.

Previous season
The Colonials finished the 2021–22 season 8–24, 5–16 in Horizon League play to finish in tenth place. As the No. 10 seed, they upset No. 7 seed Youngstown State in the first round of the Horizon League tournament, before falling to top-seeded Cleveland State.

Roster

Schedule and results

|-
!colspan=12 style=| Exhibition

|-
!colspan=12 style=| Regular season

|-
!colspan=9 style=| Horizon League tournament

|-

Sources

References

Robert Morris Colonials men's basketball seasons
Robert Morris
Robert Morris Colonials men's basketball team
Robert Morris Colonials men's basketball team